Viktor Vladimirovich Svezhov (born 17 May 1991) is a Russian professional footballer for KAMAZ Naberezhnye Chelny.

Club career
He made his professional debut in the Russian Premier League on 24 May 2009 for FC Dynamo Moscow in a game against FC Zenit St. Petersburg.

Career statistics

Club

Honors
Istiklol
 Tajikistan Higher League (1): 2020
 Tajik Supercup (1): 2020

References

External links
 
 
 
 Profile at Dynamo Moscow website 

1991 births
Living people
People from Krasnogorsk, Moscow Oblast
Sportspeople from Moscow Oblast
Russian footballers
Russia youth international footballers
Russia under-21 international footballers
Association football midfielders
FC Dynamo Moscow players
FC Tom Tomsk players
FC Luch Vladivostok players
PFC Krylia Sovetov Samara players
FC Torpedo Moscow players
FC Sibir Novosibirsk players
FC Fakel Voronezh players
FC Baltika Kaliningrad players
FC Minsk players
FC Istiklol players
FC KAMAZ Naberezhnye Chelny players
Russian Premier League players
Russian First League players
Russian Second League players
Belarusian Premier League players
Tajikistan Higher League players
Russian expatriate footballers
Expatriate footballers in Belarus
Russian expatriate sportspeople in Belarus
Expatriate footballers in Tajikistan
Russian expatriate sportspeople in Tajikistan